Carl Thompson (1982 – 21 June 2015) was the heaviest man in the United Kingdom, weighing   at the time of his death.

Biography
Thompson, of Dover, Kent, was eating heavily at the age of three or four years, sneaking downstairs and eating from the cupboards. At the same age, he took food from his neighbour's freezer. He attended Harbour Specialist School in Dover.

He consumed 10,000 calories a day, four times his recommended intake. His food cost £200 per week, including paying takeaway owners to let themselves into his flat to deliver meals to his bed, using spare keys he had made for them.

Thompson could not wear clothes.

In his last year, Thompson was alone and entirely bedridden. He had twice-daily visits from carers to dress and bathe him. He also suffered five heart attacks.

In April 2015, he appeared via video link on the ITV show This Morning, where Dr. Dawn Harper told him that he was suffering from other people's kindness. Thompson said that he used his weight to tell others not to follow his example. After the television appearance he received support from local people, including someone who sent him healthier meals.

Death
Kent Police were informed of Thompson's death at 10:38 a.m. on 21 June 2015. It took six hours (including time taken to remove a wall) for three undertakers, two police officers and firemen to remove his body.

See also
 List of the heaviest people

References

2015 deaths
People from Dover, Kent
Obesity in the United Kingdom
Year of birth uncertain
1982 births